Tilt Renewables Pty Ltd is an Australian electricity generation company. It was previously dual listed on the New Zealand stock exchange and Australian stock exchange. As of 2022, the Powering Australian Renewables has merged with Tilt Renewables following a complex acquisition and merger, making it the largest private developer and generator of renewable electricity in Australia.

On 15 March 2021, a takeover was announced with support from the largest shareholders and independent board members. The proposed scheme of arrangement would be worth  by a consortium where the New Zealand assets would be taken over by Mercury NZ and the Australian assets by Powering Australian Renewables Fund – itself a consortium of AGL Energy, QIC Global Infrastructure Fund and the Australian Government's Future Fund.

Generation assets
Below is the list of currently generating assets owned by Tilt Renewables

Developments
Below is list of the upcoming development pipeline  for Tilt Renewables

Company timeline 
October 2016: Tilt Renewables was demerged from Trustpower, with Tilt Renewables taking ownership of all operational wind assets and the wind and solar development pipeline, and Trustpower retaining all hydro assets.  Tilt Renewables was dual listed on the ASX and NZX with the ticker TLT. 

December 2019: Snowtown Wind Farm (Stage 2) was sold to Palisade Investment Partners. 

August 2021: Tilt Renewables scheme of arrangement was implemented with the New Zealand assets purchased by Mercury NZ and the Australian assets by Powering Australian Renewables Fund – itself a consortium of AGL Energy, QIC Global Infrastructure Fund and the Australian Government's Future Fund.

See also
 Electricity sector in Australia
 National Electricity Market

References

External links
 

Electric power companies of Australia
Renewable energy companies of Australia
Companies formerly listed on the Australian Securities Exchange
2022 mergers and acquisitions
Corporate spin-offs
Australian companies established in 2016
Energy companies established in 2016
Companies based in Melbourne